Ian Nicholas Flanagan (born 5 June 1980) is an English cricketer.  Flanagan is a left-handed batsman who bowls right-arm off break.  He was born at Colchester, Essex.

Flanagan made his first-class debut for Essex against Warwickshire in the 1997 County Championship.  From 1997 to 2000, he represented the county in 18 first-class matches, the last of which came against Middlesex.  In his 18 first-class matches, he scored 580 runs at a batting average of 18.70, with 3 half centuries and a high score of 61.  In the field he took 19 catches.  With the ball he took a single wicket at a bowling average of 51.00, with best figures of 1/50.

Flanagan made his debut in List A cricket for the Essex Cricket Board against Suffolk in the 2001 Cheltenham & Gloucester Trophy.

In 2002, he joined Cambridgeshire.  His debut in the Minor Counties Championship came against Buckinghamshire.  From 2002 to 2004, he represented the county in 8 Championship matches, the last of which came against Bedfordshire.  Flanagan's debut in the MCCA Knockout Trophy for Cambridgeshire came against Cumberland in 2004.  From 2004 to 2006, he played 5 Trophy matches for the county, the last of which came against Hertfordshire.  Flanagan played 2 List A matches for the county against the Middlesex Cricket Board in the 2nd round of the 2003 Cheltenham & Gloucester Trophy which was played in 2002, and against Northamptonshire in the 2004 Cheltenham & Gloucester Trophy.  In his 3 List A matches, he scored 86 runs at an average of 28.66, with a high score of 45.

References

External links
Ian Flanagan at Cricinfo
Ian Flanagan at CricketArchive

1980 births
Living people
Sportspeople from Colchester
English cricketers
Essex cricketers
Essex Cricket Board cricketers
Cambridgeshire cricketers